William Coleman (born November 16, 1988) is an American professional basketball player who last played for Mid-South Echoes of the American Basketball Association.

College career
In May 2011, Coleman graduated with a bachelor's degree in Interdisciplinary Studies. In the same year, he was awarded the 2011 Conference USA Spirit of Service Award for his contributions in community service and having good academic standing.

Professional career
On August 10, 2011, he signed with French club Le Mans Sarthe for the 2011–12 season.

On August 19, 2012, he signed with Greek club Kavala for the 2012–13 season.

On August 14, 2013, he signed with Montenegrin club Budućnost Podgorica. On March 27, 2014, he left Budućnost and signed with Macedonian club Rabotnički for the rest of the season.

On August 6, 2014, he signed a one-year deal with Israeli club Hapoel Holon. On November 6, 2014, he parted ways with Hapoel. Five days later, he signed with Greek club Panionios for the rest of the season.
 
On June 23, 2015, he signed with s.Oliver Baskets for the 2015–16 season.

The Basketball Tournament
William Coleman played for Team Memphis State in the 2018 edition of The Basketball Tournament. He averaged a team-high 18.5 points per game and 5.0 rebounds per game on 76 percent shooting. Team Memphis State reached the second round before falling to Team DRC.

References

External links 
William Coleman at eurobasket.com
William Coleman at realgm.com
William Coleman at fiba.com

1988 births
Living people
African-American basketball players
American expatriate basketball people in France
American expatriate basketball people in Greece
American expatriate basketball people in Israel
American expatriate basketball people in Montenegro
American expatriate basketball people in North Macedonia
American men's basketball players
Basketball players from Columbus, Georgia
Hapoel Holon players
Kavala B.C. players
KK Budućnost players
KK Rabotnički players
Le Mans Sarthe Basket players
Memphis Tigers men's basketball players
Miami Dade Sharks men's basketball players
Panionios B.C. players
S.Oliver Würzburg players
Centers (basketball)
21st-century African-American sportspeople
20th-century African-American people